Van Hove is a Dutch toponymic surname meaning "from/of Hove", often referring to an origin in the town Hove in the province of Antwerp; the surname is most common in Antwerp and East Flanders.  Notable people with the surname include:

Bart van Hove (1850–1914), Dutch sculptor
Bartholomeus van Hove (painter) (1790–1880), Dutch painter
Benjamin van Hove (born 1981), Belgian field hockey player
Charlotte Vanhove (1771–1860), Dutch-born French comedy stage actress
Eric Van Hove (born 1975), Belgian conceptual artist, social entrepreneur, poet and traveler
Francine Van Hove (born 1942), French painter
Fred Van Hove (born 1937), Belgian jazz musician
Hubertus van Hove (1814–1865), Dutch painter, son of Bartholomeus
Ivo van Hove (born 1958), Belgian theater director
Jozef Van Hove (1919–2014),  Belgian comics writer and artist known as Pom
Léon Van Hove (1924–1990), Belgian physicist
Van Hove singularity
Luc van Hove (born 1957), Belgian composer
Peter van Hove (died 1793), Flemish theologian
René van Hove (1913–1997), Dutch racing cyclist

See also
Van Hoof

References

Dutch-language surnames
Surnames of Belgian origin
Toponymic surnames